Stephen Payne may refer to:

Stephen Payne (energy executive) (born 1964), American lobbyist
Stephen Payne (naval architect), British ship designer
Stephen Payne, science fiction editor at Starburst magazine, Visual Imagination and the Doctor Who Appreciation Society
Stephen Payne (soccer) (born 1997), American soccer player
Stephen Payne (actor), featured in A Crime or Neon Joe, Werewolf Hunter
Stephen Payne (author), writer of westerns for Ace Books, see List of Ace western double titles
Stephen Payne (Scottish footballer) (born 1983), Scottish footballer, see 2002–03 Aberdeen F.C. season
Stephen Payne-Gallwey (18th century), member of the English Society of Dilettanti

See also
Steve Payne (disambiguation)